James Nathaniel Toney (born August 24, 1968) is an American former professional boxer who competed from 1988 to 2017. He held multiple world championships in three weight classes, including the IBF and lineal middleweight titles from 1991 to 1993, the IBF super middleweight title from 1993 to 1994, and the IBF cruiserweight title in 2003. Toney also challenged twice for a world heavyweight title in 2005 and 2006, and was victorious the first time but was later stripped due to a failed drug test. Overall, he competed in fifteen world title fights across four weight classes.

Stylistically a defensive boxer, Toney utilized the shoulder roll technique taught to him by veteran trainer Bill Miller, who had once trained heavyweight champion Ezzard Charles. Toney was an exceptional counterpuncher and inside fighter, who often preferred to fight off the ropes. He possessed fast hand speed and respectable punching power throughout his career and is also noted for his toughness, having never lost any of his 92 professional bouts via stoppage.

In 1991 and 2003, Toney was voted Fighter of the Year by The Ring magazine and the Boxing Writers Association of America. In 2011, The Ring magazine ranked him as tenth on their list of the "10 best middleweight title holders of the last 50 years." He has also made a one-time appearance in mixed martial arts, losing to Randy Couture at UFC 118. In 2001, Toney played the role of Joe Frazier in the movie Ali alongside Will Smith.

Background
Toney was born in Ann Arbor, Michigan, U.S. At around age 11, Toney first entered a boxing gym, but did not seriously pursue the sport until graduating high school. Growing up, Toney lived alongside the families of Floyd Mayweather Jr. and Buster Mathis Jr., and Toney's father himself (who was absent for Toney's upbringing) was a boxer. As a teen, Toney was often involved in street fighting and sold crack cocaine. Prior to his career in boxing, Toney was also a star football player; after high school he received scholarship offers from Western Michigan to play quarterback and from Michigan to play as a defensive back. But Toney said, "I wasn't a team player and wasn't good at taking orders. So I went into boxing." Toney also lost a significant amount of weight to begin his boxing career, having weighed 205 lbs. Toney was supposedly involved in an altercation with future Pro Football Hall of Famer Deion Sanders while at a Michigan training camp.

Amateur career
Toney had a brief but relatively successful amateur career, compiling a record of 33 wins (32 KOs) and 2 losses. Toney had his first professional fight on October 26, 1988, beating Stephen Lee by a technical knockout in the second round. As a teenager, Toney was scouted and trained by Gregory Owens, who also was his trainer through the mid-nineties. His moniker of "Lights Out" was also given by either Gregory or his son. In his 7th pro fight, Toney's manager, Johnny "Ace" Smith, was killed. Afterwards, Jackie Kallen was hired as his manager. Toney also employed the services of legendary Detroit-based trainer Bill Miller. Miller, a former boxer himself who worked in Detroit's famed Kronk Gym and assisted hall-of-fame trainer Emanuel Steward at times, is credited with developing Toney's famed "old school" or "throwback" style of fighting.

Professional career

Middleweight
Toney won the IBF and lineal middleweight titles by knocking out Michael Nunn in eleven rounds in May 1991. Toney, who entered as a 20-to-1 underdog, was down on all three judges' scorecards, but landed a left hook that put Nunn on the canvas in the eleventh round, and eventually scored a stoppage victory. The win also earned Toney the Ring Magazine Fighter Of The Year award. Toney continued a regular fight program over the next 18 months at middleweight, before outgrowing the division, where he made several successful yet disputed defenses. The most noteworthy was Toney's split decision win over Dave Tiberi in a fight that many experts feel Toney lost. The decision was so controversial that it prompted United States Senator William Roth of Delaware to call for an investigation into possible corruption in the sport. Toney also won a split decision title defense against Reggie Johnson in June 1991, retained his title with a draw against former WBA champ Mike McCallum in December 1991, and again against McCallum, this time by a majority decision, in December 1992. The McCallum fight would be Toney's last as a middleweight.

Super middleweight
On February 13, 1993, Toney challenged Iran Barkley for the IBF super middleweight title. After a dominating performance by Toney, the bout was stopped after 9 rounds by Barkley's trainer, Eddie Mustafa Muhammad, due to Barkley suffering severe swelling around both eyes.

Toney won five fights throughout 1993, then defeated Tony "The Punching Postman" Thornton in his 1st title defense in October, via a landslide points victory. In his second defense, Toney beat the 24–0 Tim Littles by a 4th-round KO. During this bout, Toney suffered a bad cut which caused the referee and ringside doctor to intervene before round 4, allowing him one more round to try to end the fight. His next defense was against former IBF Light Heavyweight champion Prince Charles Williams. Despite having a point deducted for hitting Williams after the bell in one round and having his left eye completely swollen shut, Toney knocked Williams out in the 12th and final round. This win paved the way for his fight with undefeated 1988 Olympic silver medalist Roy Jones Jr.

Jones won a landslide decision over Toney, an upset at the time, briefly flooring Toney for the first time with a flash knockdown in the 3rd round. Jones used one of his "cockfighting" feints to lure Toney in, and as Toney mocked Jones, Toney got caught with a leaping left hook. After the fight Toney blamed making the weight for his flat performance and the loss of his cherished unbeaten record. It was his last fight at the weight.

His next fight saw him lose to Montell Griffin at light heavyweight in February 1995. After then winning a series of fights at light heavyweight, cruiserweight, and even heavyweight, he again faced Montell Griffin in December 1996 and once again lost a close decision. He beat old foe Mike McCallum in February 1997, but then lost to journeyman Drake Thadzi in his next fight.

Cruiserweight
After taking some time off from the ring, Toney came back in 1999, seemingly focused on reclaiming his status as an elite fighter. He defeated former title holders and title contenders Adolpho Washington, Steve Little, Ramón Garbey, Saul Montana, Sione Asipeli, Courtney Butler, and Michael Rush. In August 2002, Toney beat Jason Robinson in an IBF Cruiserweight title elimination fight. This set up a fight between Toney and the champion, Vassiliy Jirov. After a postponement, the fight happened on April 26, 2003. Going into the 12th and final round, with the scores fairly even and the fight in the balance, Toney knocked the undefeated Jirov down in the 12th. The Kazakh rose from the canvas to go to the distance, but Toney got the judges verdict and was now a three-weight World Champion.

For Toney's performance he was awarded comeback of the year and named fighter of the year. The fight itself was named "Fight Of The Year" by The Ring magazine. Immediately afterward, Toney moved up to heavyweight, where he campaigned for the next 7 years.

After stepping back down to Cruiserweight, on November 4, 2011, Toney stepped into the ring at 199 lbs, the lowest he has been since 2003 against Russian star Denis Lebedev in Russia for the interim WBA World cruiserweight title. Toney was never competitive throughout the bout after encountering problems with his left knee during round two, and the judges all had it 120–108 for Lebedev. A week after the fight it was revealed Toney needed surgery to repair his knee.

Heavyweight

As far back as Toney's middleweight years, he insisted that he would one day be the heavyweight champion of the world. His October 4, 2003, victory over aging former heavyweight champion Evander Holyfield was Toney's entry into the heavyweight division. After a shaky first round, Toney picked apart Holyfield with shots to the body and head before stopping him in the 9th round. After the fight Toney declared he was "undestructable", that he "got milk baby" and didn't want any "bad ass questions" from announcer Jim Gray.

On September 23, 2004, Toney faced off with Rydell Booker. Although Toney injured his left arm, he was still able to defeat the clearly outmatched Booker, getting a 12-round unanimous decision for the fringe IBA heavyweight title.

On April 30, 2005, he defeated John Ruiz by a unanimous decision in a 12-round match for the World Boxing Association (WBA) heavyweight Championship. However, Toney failed his post-fight drug test, testing positive for the anabolic steroid stanozolol. This led to the New York Athletic Commission changing the bout's official outcome to a "no-contest", deducting the win from Toney's career record and banning him from boxing for 90 days. The WBA ordered that Ruiz be reinstated as its champion and that Toney be ineligible for another WBA Heavyweight title shot for two years. Toney defended himself by claiming that the steroids were given to him by a doctor to treat the arm injury he suffered during the Rydell Booker fight.

In his bout after the Ruiz fight, Toney won a unanimous decision victory over former heavyweight contender Dominic Guinn. Toney next fought against Hasim Rahman on March 18, 2006, for the WBC Heavyweight title. The result was a twelve-round majority draw.

Toney's next two outings were losses to Samuel Peter. The first fight was held in Los Angeles, California on September 2, 2006. Toney lost by split decision. The return bout was held in Hollywood, Florida, on January 6, 2007, and Toney once again lost to Peter, this time by unanimous decision. Both fights were WBC eliminator bouts for the belt held by Oleg Maskaev.

Toney's next bout came on December 13, 2008, against Fres Oquendo. Oquendo was penalized one point in round eight for a rabbit punch, which would prove to be the deciding factor in the fight. Toney won a close, controversial split decision. On September 12, 2009, James fought heavyweight fighter Matthew Greer (12–5–0 11KO) at the Pechanga Resort & Casino. James won via TKO victory in round two.

On February 24, 2011, Toney made his return to boxing and won a ten-round unanimous decision against Damon Reed. All three judges scored the bout 100–90. For this bout Toney weighed in at a career high of 257 lbs.

On April 7, 2012 Toney fought Bobby Gunn and won by a fifth round stoppage due to a hand injury sustained by Gunn. This was recognized as a world title by the International Boxing Union, a minor boxing organization.

Toney travelled to Australia in April 2013 to face Lucas Browne for the WBF heavyweight title. Toney lost the fight by wide unanimous decision. Seven months later on November 14, Toney travelled to London, England to compete in the heavyweight Prizefighter Series held at the famous York Hall venue. It was a special UK vs USA tournament with six fighters facing off in three round bouts. In the quarter final, Toney faced English journeyman Matt Legg, and won by TKO in the third round, advancing to the semi finals. In the semi final, he faced fellow American Jason Gavern and lost by majority decision, and was eliminated from the tournament.

Toney's final bout came on May 13, 2017 at the age of 48. He defeated Mike Sheppard by sixth round stoppage; winning the WBF heavyweight title. After a career spanning 29 years and 92 professional bouts, Toney has confirmed he is officially retired.

Boxing style
Toney is well known for his "old school" or "throwback" style of boxing, which consisted of frequent head movement and shoulder rolls to avoid punches, as well as his ability to fight off the ropes using slick upper body movement and in-fighting. As such, he is said to have possessed a very high ring IQ. Although Toney was considered a defensive fighter by many, he still applied pressure to his opponents and usually forced his style against them; in some ways he could be considered a defensive pressure fighter. Because of his experience, defensive skills and extremely durable chin, he was never stopped in his 29-year professional career and was rarely knocked down.

Mixed martial arts career
Toney was spotted in attendance at UFC 108 on January 2, 2010, which led to talks between him and UFC President Dana White regarding fighting in the organization. On March 3, it was confirmed by White that the two had agreed and signed a multi-fight deal with the company, at the age of 42.

To help his transition into MMA, Toney was coached by trainer Juanito Ibarra. Toney was later coached by Trevor Sherman.

Toney vs. Couture
His debut fight was against UFC Hall of Famer and former UFC Heavyweight and Light Heavyweight champion Randy Couture at UFC 118 on August 28, 2010. Couture scored a takedown against Toney early in the first round, and went on to submit Toney with an arm-triangle choke. Toney was subsequently released from his contract with the UFC. The match achieved notoriety, though it drew criticisms of being a freak show fight, among them by UFC President Dana White himself.

Professional boxing record

Mixed martial arts record

|-
|Loss
|align=center|0–1
|Randy Couture
|Submission (arm-triangle choke)
|UFC 118
|
|align=center|1
|align=center|3:19
|Boston, Massachusetts, United States
|
|-

See also
List of boxing triple champions
List of middleweight boxing champions
List of super middleweight boxing champions
List of cruiserweight boxing champions
List of IBF world champions

References

External links

James Toney  at About.com
James Toney at Cyber Boxing Zone

 
Inside James Toney's training camp at FightFan

1968 births
Living people
African-American boxers
Boxers from Michigan
Light-heavyweight boxers
Heavyweight boxers
American male mixed martial artists
African-American mixed martial artists
Mixed martial artists from Michigan
Heavyweight mixed martial artists
Mixed martial artists utilizing boxing
American sportspeople in doping cases
Doping cases in boxing
International Boxing Federation champions
American male boxers
World middleweight boxing champions
World super-middleweight boxing champions
World cruiserweight boxing champions
Prizefighter contestants
Sportspeople from Ann Arbor, Michigan
Ultimate Fighting Championship male fighters
21st-century African-American people
20th-century African-American sportspeople
International Boxing Hall of Fame inductees